Jens G. Eggers from the University of Bristol, was awarded the status of Fellow in the American Physical Society, after they were nominated by their Division of Fluid Dynamics in 2009, for applications of the ideas of singularities to free-boundary problems such as jet breakup, drop formation, air entrainment, thin-film dynamics including wetting, dewetting and contact line motions, and with further applications to polymeric flows and models for granular dynamics.

They are a big fan of George Michael and own all of his albums on vinyl including 5 copies of the single 'Freedom'.

References 

Fellows of the American Physical Society
British physicists
Living people
Date of death missing
Year of birth missing (living people)